Charles Fisher may refer to:

Politicians
 Charles Fisher (congressman) (1789–1849), American politician
 Charles Fisher (Canadian politician) (1808–1880), Canadian jurist & politician
 Charles Fisher (North-West Territories politician), (1865–unknown), Canadian politician
 Charles W. Fisher (Canadian politician) (1866–1919), Canadian politician
 Charles W. Fisher (American politician) (1896–1981), California politician
 Charles Thompson Fisher (1846–1930), American farmer and politician from Wisconsin
 Charles M. Fisher (1899–1966), American politician

Others
 Charles Frederick Fisher (1816–1861), American legislator, railroad president and soldier
 Charles Fisher (actor) (1816–1891), Anglo-American comedian
 Charles T. Fisher (1880–1963), American businessman
 Charles Dennis Fisher (1877–1916), British academic
 Charlie Fisher (1892–1983), Australian footballer
 Charles Fisher (poet) (1914–2006), poet and journalist in Britain and Canada
 Charles Fisher (headmaster) (1921–1978), Australian headmaster
 Charles Fisher (producer) (fl. 1990s), Australian record producer
 Charles Fisher (American football) (born 1976), American football defensive back
 Charlie Fisher (baseball) (1852–1917), 19th-century baseball player
 Charles Fisher (baseball), baseball player for the 1889 Louisville Colonels
 Charles J. Fisher, author and historic preservation activist in Los Angeles
 Charles Brown Fisher (1817–1908), Australian pastoralist and racehorse breeder
 Charles Fisher (footballer) (1899–1985), English footballer
 Charles R. Fisher, marine biologist
 Charles W. Fisher Jr., United States Navy admiral
 C. Miller Fisher (1913–2012), neurologist
 Charles Fisher (rower), 2016 and 2018 member of Cambridge University boat race crew
 Charles F. Fisher, county commissioner in Somerset County, Maryland

See also
 Charles Fischer, a minor character on Terminator: The Sarah Connor Chronicles